Rebecca Edison "Bex" Taylor-Klaus (born August 12, 1994) is an American actor. They rose to fame for their starring role as Bullet on the crime drama series The Killing (2013). They gained further prominence with roles as Sin on the superhero drama series Arrow (2013–15), Lex on the comedy series House of Lies (2014), as Audrey Jensen on the horror series Scream (2015–16), and the voice of Katie "Pidge" Holt on the Netflix animated series Voltron: Legendary Defender (2016–18). They played the character Bishop in the drama series Deputy, which aired from January to April 2020.

Early life
Taylor-Klaus was born in Atlanta, Georgia to a Jewish family. Taylor-Klaus began acting by performing Shakespeare in an after-school program while in the third grade, and it became a consistent part of their extracurricular and summer activities. They also performed in a high school improvisation troupe and played several roles before completing high school. Working with friends, they also started a junior high school acting troupe to train young actors. In addition to drama, Taylor-Klaus was an accomplished athlete, starting at catcher on the high school varsity softball team as a freshman and also playing third base. They have two siblings; Syd Taylor-Klaus and Josh Taylor-Klaus. In mid-2012, Taylor-Klaus moved to Los Angeles to pursue an acting career, attending Bridges Academy.

Career

2012–2014: Early career and breakthrough
Taylor-Klaus began acting in Shakespeare plays while in the third grade. However, their first professional acting role was that of Bullet, a homeless street-wise lesbian teen, on the third season of the AMC crime drama series The Killing, which aired in 2013. Writing about playing Bullet, Taylor-Klaus said: "to be an actor is to want to visit the dark places that humans strive so hard to stay away from.”

From 2013 to 2015, Taylor-Klaus played the recurring role of Sin in The CW superhero drama series Arrow.

2015–present: Further success
Taylor-Klaus gained further success with their starring role of Audrey Jensen, a bi-curious teenager helping friends investigate a serial killer, in the first two seasons of the MTV horror drama series Scream. They appeared on the series from 2015 to 2016.

After gaining prominence from roles in The Killing and Arrow, they went on to play several guest roles in numerous television series, including Glee and iZombie. In 2016, they began voicing the starring role of Katie "Pidge" Holt in the Netflix animated series Voltron: Legendary Defender.

Taylor-Klaus had a starring role as Taylor in the slasher horror film Hell Fest (2018). They also starred as Hannah Perez in the 2018 musical comedy film Dumplin', which is a film adaptation of Julie Murphy’s New York Times bestselling young adult novel. The film, which co-stars Jennifer Aniston, was directed by Anne Fletcher. Taylor-Klaus also played Violette Paich in Mario Sorrenti’s horror film Discarnate (2018).

Personal life
Taylor-Klaus has a dog named Bullet, after their first major role in The Killing.

In November 2016, Taylor-Klaus came out as gay on Twitter, saying: "hello my name is bex and yes the rumors are true I am gay." In July 2018, Taylor-Klaus came out as non-binary in a similar tweet and stated a preference for they/them pronouns.

Taylor-Klaus was diagnosed with ADHD in elementary school and played multiple sports, including baseball, which they said helped to control it.

In August 2019, Taylor-Klaus got engaged to their girlfriend, actress Alicia Sixtos, and married in October 2020.

Filmography

Film

Television

Web

Video games

Awards and nominations

References

External links
 

1994 births
21st-century American actors
Actors from Atlanta
American film actors
American television actors
Jewish American actors
LGBT Jews
LGBT people from Georgia (U.S. state)
Living people
American non-binary actors
21st-century American Jews
21st-century American LGBT people
Alumni of The Paideia School
American voice actors